Palewyami, also known as Altinin and Poso Creek Yokuts, was a Yokuts dialect of California.

Palewyami was spoken in Kern County, along Poso Creek. The language has not been spoken since the 1930s.

References

Sources
 Gamble, Geoffrey, Yokuts Imperative and Demonstrative Pronouns, American Indian Linguistics and Ethnography in Honor of Laurence C. Thompson (eds., Anthony Mattina and Timothy Montler), pp. 385-396, Missoula, University of Montana Occasional Papers in Linguistics, no. 10, 1993,

External links 
Palewyami at California Language Archive

Yokutsan languages
Extinct languages of North America
History of Kern County, California